Westringia fitzgeraldensis is a species of plant in the mint family that is endemic to Western Australia.

Etymology
The specific epithet fitzgeraldensis refers to the type locality.

Description
The species grows as an erect, open shrub to 1.2 m in height. The leaves are 7.5–11.1 mm long and 1.1–1.6 mm wide, occurring in crowded whorls of four. The flowers are white, appearing in September.

Distribution and habitat
The species occurs in the Esperance Plains IBRA bioregion of south-western Australia. It is known only from a single population, in a valley west of Hopetoun, in the Fitzgerald River National Park. There it is found on alluvial, orange-brown, loam soils with quartzite fragments, in open mallee woodland, in association with Eucalyptus uncinata, E. redunca, E. conglobata, Melaleuca pomphostoma, M. suberosa and Siegfriedia darwinioides.

References

fitzgeraldensis
Lamiales of Australia
Eudicots of Western Australia
Plants described in 2013